Enzo Cavalli (born 11 September 1937) is a former Italian triple jumper who competed at the 1960 Summer Olympics,

References

External links
 

1937 births
Living people
Athletes (track and field) at the 1960 Summer Olympics
Italian male triple jumpers
Olympic athletes of Italy
Athletics competitors of Fiamme Oro